This is a list of all personnel changes for the 1955 NBA off-season and 1955–56 NBA season.

Events

September 30, 1955
 The Fort Wayne Pistons traded Monk Meineke to the Rochester Royals for Odie Spears.

October 25, 1955
 The Rochester Royals signed Connie Simmons as a free agent.

October 26, 1955
 The Rochester Royals sold Arnie Risen to the Boston Celtics.

November 28, 1955
 The Minneapolis Lakers sold Jim Holstein to the Fort Wayne Pistons.

December 3, 1955
 The Philadelphia Warriors sold Bob Schafer to the St. Louis Hawks.

December 16, 1955
The Fort Wayne Pistons sold Johnny Horan to the Minneapolis Lakers.

?
 The Fort Wayne Pistons signed Alex Hannum as a free agent.

January ?, 1956
 The St. Louis Hawks released Chuck Cooper.
 The Fort Wayne Pistons signed Chuck Cooper as a free agent.

January 27, 1956
 Joe Lapchick resigns as head coach for New York Knicks.

February 9, 1956
 The New York Knicks hired Vince Boryla as head coach.

April 30, 1956
 The Boston Celtics traded Cliff Hagan and Ed Macauley to the St. Louis Hawks for Bill Russell.
 The New York Knicks traded Gene Shue to the Fort Wayne Pistons for Ron Sobie.

References

Notes
 Number of years played in the NBA prior to the draft
 Career with the franchise that drafted the player
 Never played a game for the franchise

External links
NBA Transactions at NBA.com
1955-56 NBA Transactions| Basketball-Reference.com

References

Transactions
1955-56